Fear Factor: Khatron Ke Khiladi – Made in India (Fear Factor: Players of Danger - Made in India) is a spin-off of Fear Factor: Khatron Ke Khiladi, an Indian reality and stunt television series featuring previous contestants of the show. The show aired from  1 August 2020 to 30 August 2020 on Colors TV. The series is produced by Endemol India, and is hosted by Rohit Shetty, and Farah Khan as interim host for first 2 episodes.
Inclusions were made from season 7,8,9,10 only . Nia Sharma was declared as the winner of this limited edition followed by Karan Wahi and Jasmin Bhasin being Runner ups. This season was filmed entirely in Mumbai.

Contestants

Elimination chart

  Winner
  1st runner-up
  2nd runner-up
 Finalists
 The contestant won the stunt or was on the winning team and exempted from performing further stunts for the week/cycle.
 The contestant lost the stunt and received Fear Funda.
 The contestant got rid of Fear Funda by winning pre-elimination stunt.
 The contestant was placed in the bottom and performed elimination stunt.
 The contestant was safe from elimination by winning elimination stunt.
The contestant was exempted from performing pre-elimination and elimination stunt
 The contestant was eliminated.
 Jacket - The contestant won a special advantage.
 Not in Competition
 The contestant was a Wild Card Entry
 The contestant quit the show.

References

External links 
 Khatron Ke Khiladi – Made in India at Colors TV
 
 Khatron Ke Khiladi Made in India on MX Player
 Khatron Ke Khiladi Made in India on Voot

Fear Factor: Khatron Ke Khiladi
2020 Indian television seasons